La Roue ('The Wheel') is a French silent film, directed by Abel Gance, who also directed Napoléon and J'accuse. It was released in 1923. The film used then-revolutionary lighting techniques, and rapid scene changes and cuts.

Plot
Railroad engineer Sisif (Severin-Mars) rescues a small orphan, whose name he learns is Norma (Ivy Close), following a disastrous crash.  He raises the little girl as his own, along with his son Elie (Gabriel de Gravone), whose mother died during his birth.

In time, Norma becomes a lively and playful young woman. Her greatest joy is time spent with Elie, by now a handsome violin maker, whom she believes to be her natural brother.  But Sisif, to his own horror, finds himself falling in love with his adopted daughter.  Sisif confesses to a wealthy colleague, Hersan (Pierre Magnier), Norma's origin and that he is attracted to her. Hersan threatens Sisif with blackmail if he does not consent to give Norma to him in marriage.  Norma herself is reluctant but is moved by the prospect of greater prosperity. Sisif reluctantly agrees to the marriage, and himself drives the train that will deliver Norma to her husband. Distraught, he drives recklessly, and nearly wrecks the train. After some months of marriage, Norma writes to say that it is unhappy. Elie discovers the truth about Norma's origin and reproaches his father for keeping it secret, thereby preventing Elie from marrying her before she married Hersan.

An eye injury forces Sisif to abandon the mainline railways, and he goes to work instead on the funicular at Mont Blanc.  When Norma comes to vacation at Chamonix with her husband, she learns where Sisif and Elie live.  Hersan finds out that Elie is also in love with Norma when he smashes a violin that was made by Elie. Inside is a love letter that only Hersan reads.  A jealous Hersan fights with Elie on the edge of a precipice. Elie shoots Hersan in self-defense, and afterward falls to his death. Sisif, enraged by Elie's death, blames Norma and drives her from him. Without Hersan, Norma is left penniless, while Sisif's failing sight means that he loses his job. Norma goes to live with him without his permission and manages to stay undetected in his shack for a time.  When he at last realizes she is there, they cling to one another, time and tragedy having restored the balance in their father-daughter relationship.

Sisif grows old, cared for by Norma.  After sending her out to join in a local festivity, Sisif waits at the window, watching not with his eyes but with his mind.  As Norma dances, Sisif dies.

Cast
 Séverin-Mars as Sisif
 Ivy Close as Norma
 Gabriel de Gravone as Elie
 Pierre Magnier as Jacques de Hersan
 Max Maxudian as Le minéralogiste Kalatikascopoulos
 Georges Térof as Machefer
 Gil Clary as Dalilah

Reception 
The film has an 80% score on Rotten Tomatoes, with 5 collected ratings.

Preservation status
The original version encompassed 32 reels, which ran for either seven and a half or nine hours (sources disagree). In 1924, Gance edited it down to two and a half hours for general distribution. A modern reconstruction from five different versions, available on DVD, is nearly four and a half hours long. An almost seven hours long restored version was shown at the 2019 Lumière Film Festival.

See also 
 List of incomplete or partially lost films

References
Notes

External links
 
 
 

1923 films
French silent feature films
1923 drama films
Films directed by Abel Gance
Rail transport films
French black-and-white films
Films scored by Arthur Honegger
French drama films
Silent drama films
1920s French films
1920s French-language films